Bent is the third studio album by American musician Cody Critcheloe, under his pseudonym Ssion. It was released on September 18, 2012, by Dovecote Records.

Critical reception
Bent was met with "generally favorable" reviews from critics. At Metacritic, which assigns a weighted average rating out of 100 to reviews from mainstream publications, this release received an average score of 63 based on 4 reviews.

In a review for Tiny Mix Tapes, critic reviewer Conrad Tao wrote: "Bent, the band’s newest record, is brazenly shallow pop music, aware of and confident in its insubstantiality and general tackiness. Bent seems like a fashionable record at the moment is curious — the witch house camp's visual sense is closely aligned with Cody Critcheloe's distinctive artwork, and 1980s pop deconstructionism is certainly experiencing a particularly strong renaissance right now." Eric Grandy of Pitchfork said: "It's unfair to judge Bent as a stand-alone object, as the point or the primary document of the SSION project rather than as merely one prong of many in a multimedia pincer attack."

Track listing

References

External links
 
 
 Bent at Dovecote Records

2012 albums
Dovecote Records albums